= Maritime province =

Maritime province may refer to:

- The Maritimes, or the Maritime provinces, a region of Eastern Canada consisting of three provinces: New Brunswick, Nova Scotia, and Prince Edward Island
- Primorsky Krai, Russia, sometimes translated as 'Maritime Province'
